"Ships (Where Were You)" is a song by Scottish rock band Big Country, written by Stuart Adamson (lyrics, music) and Bruce Watson (music). The song was originally recorded for and included on the band's fifth studio album No Place Like Home (1991). It was then re-recorded for their following album, The Buffalo Skinners (1993), and released as the album's second single. "Ships (Where Were You)" reached No. 29 in the UK and remained in the charts for three weeks. A music video was filmed to promote the single and directed by Nick Morris.

In a 1991 interview for the Big Country fanzine Inwards, Adamson described "Ships" as being "about people that think they get passed by things, because everybody does at certain times".

Background
"Ships" was originally recorded for No Place Like Home as a piano and vocal-led track, with string quartet. The band re-recorded the song for The Buffalo Skinners and gave it the "guitar treatment", as they were not happy with the original version. Watson told the Lennox Herald in 1993: "We didn't like how "Ships" and "We're Not in Kansas" turned out originally. Our relationship with Phonogram Records was at an all-time low and we simply weren't doing justice to some of the songs we'd written. So we decided to go back in and do them again."

Speaking to Simon McKenzie in 1993, Adamson commented: "I'll [tell] you how bad things got. When I took the original demo versions of "Ships" and "Kansas" into the record company, they didn't even want them on No Place Like Home. They couldn't even hear them as songs. But "Ships" has been a huge success throughout Europe at the moment. Even as we speak, it's gone really big all over the radio."

Reception
Upon release in 1993, Peter Kinghorn of the Newcastle Evening Chronicle described the song as a "powerful rock ballad" with a "fine performance". In a review of The Buffalo Skinners, Dick Hogan of The Gazette considered the song a combination of "Witchy Woman" and "Wild Horses". He added: "Here Big Country varies its straight-ahead driving sound with a softer beginning before kicking into overdrive. The lyric is a dark picture about human despair." Kevin Belvins of The Leader-Post described the song as a "great power ballad". Christi Conover of The Daily Herald commented: "...when things slow down for the song "Ships", the listener discovers a beautiful utilization of piano and keyboards."

Track listing
7" single
"Ships (Where Were You)" - 5:54
"Oh Well" - 2:18

CD single
"Ships (Where Were You)" - 5:54
"Woodstock" - 4:13
"Oh Well" - 2:18
"(Don't Fear) The Reaper" - 4:30

CD single (UK #2)
"Ships (Where Were You)" - 5:54
"Buffalo Skinners" - 4:59
"Cracked Actor" - 3:09
"Paranoid" - 2:46

CD single (UK promo)
"Ships (Where Were You)" (Radio Edit) - 4:10
"Ships (Where Were You)" (Full Length) - 5:54

Charts

Personnel

1993 recording
Big Country
Stuart Adamson - vocals, guitar
Bruce Watson - guitar
Tony Butler - bass, backing vocals

Additional musicians
Colin Berwick - keyboards
Simon Phillips - drums

Production
 Big Country - producers (all tracks), mixing (all tracks except "Ships" and "Buffalo Skinners")
 Dave Bascombe - mixing on "Ships"
 Chris Sheldon - recording on "Ships" and "Buffalo Skinners", mixing on "Buffalo Skinners"
 Simon Dawson - recording on "Oh Well", "Woodstock", "(Don't Fear) The Reaper" and "Paranoid"

References

1991 songs
1993 singles
Big Country songs
Songs written by Stuart Adamson